The women's singles of the 2008 ECM Prague Open tournament was played on clay in Prague, Czech Republic.

Akiko Morigami was the defending champion, but chose not to participate that year.

Vera Zvonareva won in the final 7–6(2), 6–2, against Victoria Azarenka.

Seeds

Draw

Finals

Top half

Bottom half

External links
Draw and Qualifying Draw

2008 - Women's Singles
ECM Prague Open
2008 in Czech women's sport